A Woman's Place is a documentary film by Rayka Zehtabchi. The 29 minute film, commissioned by KitchenAid, was produced by Digitas, Ventureland, and Vox Creative.

The movie follows three female chefs including, Karyn Tomlinson of Minneapolis,  and explores the challenges they face in a male-dominated profession.

The film also spurred a partnership with the James Beard Foundation (JBF) to form a mentorship program advancing women in culinary arts.

A Woman's Place premiered on August 24th, 2020 on Hulu.

References

External links 
 

2019 films
Documentary films about women